The T1 General or T1 (entitled Income Tax and Benefit Return) is the form used in Canada by individuals to file their personal income tax return.  Individuals with tax payable during a calendar year must use the T1 to file their total income from all sources, including employment and self-employment income, interest, dividends, and capital gains, rental income, and so on.  Foreign income must also be declared and included in the total income.  After applicable deductions and adjustments, the net income and taxable income are determined, from which the federal tax and the provincial or territorial tax are calculated to give the total payable.  Subtracting total credits, which include the tax withheld, the filer will either receive a refund or have balance owing, which may be zero.

The T1 and any balance owing for each year are generally due by the end of April of the following year.  The T1 filing deadline (April 30) is extended to June 15 where the taxpayer or their spouse earned income from a business at any time during the calendar year.

There is no requirement to file a T1 return for the year if the tax balance payable for that year is $0 or negative.  However, certain government benefits (such as the GST/HST credit and Canada Child Tax Benefit) are only paid if a T1 return is filed for the year.

See also
 Income taxes in Canada

References

External links
 cra-arc.gc.ca: T1 forms
 cra-arc.gc.ca: Where to send your T1
 Reducing taxes in Canada

Taxation in Canada
Tax forms